W. H. Patterson (date of birth unknown) was a Scottish footballer who played in The Football League for Sheffield United between 1891 and 1892. Primarily a defender he also filled in on various positions during his time at Bramall Lane.

Patterson (or Pattison as he was referred to on occasions) was simply described as being "from Edinburgh" by the local press on his signing by United in December 1891.  He featured only irregularly in the first team and played just a handful of competitive games.  By 1892 and with United now in The Football League more first team chances looked beyond him and it was announced he had left the club by December of that year. He went on to play for Gainsborough Trinity.

Career statistics

References

Footballers from Edinburgh
Scottish footballers
Association football defenders
Sheffield United F.C. players
Gainsborough Trinity F.C. players
English Football League players
Year of birth unknown
Date of death unknown
Northern Football League players